Hoy Gano Yo (en: "Today I Win") is the tenth track from WarCry's self titled debut album. It's one of the band's best-known songs, played nearly in every concert often as closing track, due to its lyrics about the way heavy metal is seen in the society. "Hoy Gano Yo" is featured on live album Directo A La Luz on both DVD and CD versions. The song also appears on Finnish music video game Frets on Fire.

Meaning
On the band's official website Víctor García stated that the song talks about heavy metal, and about the "heavies", with a clear message, "one for all and all for one". He said the main purpose of the song is "to appeal for unity" among the metal enthusiasts, stating also that "sometimes total victory is an accumulation of partial victories, like opening a bar to play only metal music [...] to do things to make heavy metal more important in the society."

Hoy Gano Yo makes reference to how ignored is heavy metal on these times, in lyrics like:

On the main chorus appears what García said it was an "appeal for unity"

Personnel
Víctor García - vocals, bass, guitars, keyboards
Alberto Ardines - drums
with:
Fernando Mon - guitar solos
Pablo García - guitar solos

Notes

External links 
 WarCry — official website
Hoy Gano Yo at YouTube

WarCry (band) songs
2005 songs